Streptomyces bohaiensis is a bacterium species from the genus of Streptomyces which has been isolated from the fish Scomberomorus niphonius from the Bohai Sea in China.

See also 
 List of Streptomyces species

References

External links
Type strain of Streptomyces bohaiensis at BacDive -  the Bacterial Diversity Metadatabase

bohaiensis
Bacteria described in 2015